Počarová is a village and municipality in Považská Bystrica District in the Trenčín Region of north-western Slovakia.

History
In historical records the village was first mentioned in 1466.

Geography
The municipality lies at an elevation of 337 metres and covers an area of 2.316 km². It has a population of about 145 people.

References

External links

 
http://www.statistics.sk/mosmis/eng/run.html

Villages and municipalities in Považská Bystrica District